The British Rail Class 97/6 0-6-0 diesel shunting locomotives were purpose-built for departmental duties by Ruston & Hornsby at Lincoln in 1953 (97650) or 1959 (97651-654).  There are minor technical differences between 97650 and the 1959 batch.

This class of five locomotives is outwardly similar to the Class 04 locomotives built around the same time but, internally, they are quite different.  The Class 97/6 is diesel-electric while the Class 04 is diesel-mechanical.

The class 97/6 is related to the older British Rail Class D1/3, which was a 0-4-0 Diesel Mechanical version of the Ruston & Hornsby 165DE.

Overview

The fleet was originally numbered PWM650-654 in the Western Region Permanent Way Machines series, hence were commonly referred to as the “PWM shunters” or simply “PWMs”. Between 1979 and 1981 they were renumbered as Class 97 locomotives. Originally painted in BR Green livery, this was later superseded by BR Blue and finally Civil Engineering Yellow. They were employed at various locations, including Reading West (97650/653/654), Gloucester / Cardiff Canton / Radyr (97651) and Plymouth Laira (97652).

Specification
 Diesel engine: Ruston 6VPH of 165 bhp (123 kW) at 1,250 rpm
 Transmission: Electric,
 Main generator: 1 x British Thomson-Houston RTB6034
 Traction motor: 1 x British Thomson-Houston RTA5041 (nose-suspended)
 Driving wheel diameter,
 97650: 3 ft 2½in (978 mm)
 97651-654: 3 ft 4in (1,016 mm)
 Weight,
 97650: 28 tons (29 tonnes)
 97651-654: 30 tons (31 tonnes)
 Maximum tractive effort: 17,000 lb (75 kN)
 Maximum speed: 20 mph (32 km/h)
 Brake type: Straight air on locomotive, automatic vacuum for train

A special feature of this class is that the electric traction motor can be disengaged from the wheels.  This allows the locomotive to be hauled by another locomotive at speeds above 20 mph.

Withdrawal
With the privatisation of British Rail these locomotives were largely made redundant. Three locomotives had already been withdrawn from traffic, and only nos. 97651 and 97654 survived long enough to pass into English Welsh & Scottish (EWS) ownership. Number 97654 was sold to an infrastructure company based in Edinburgh, and remained in use until 2005, when it was preserved. Number 97651 was one of the first locomotives sold by EWS into preservation.

Preservation

Three of the five locomotives have been preserved on heritage railways.
97650 - Lincolnshire Wolds Railway
97651 - Swindon and Cricklade Railway
97654 - Heritage Shunters Trust

Incomplete remains of 97653 were stored at the former Ministry of Defence depot at Long Marston, Warwickshire until taken to Hurst's, Andover for scrap in August 2011.

Fleet details

References

Sources

External links
Heritage Shunters Trust - owners of 97654.

PWM651 info page at Northampton & Lamport Railway
 departmentals.com
 PWM page at Preserved Shunters

97 6
Ruston & Hornsby locomotives
C locomotives
British Rail departmental locomotives
Standard gauge locomotives of Great Britain
Railway locomotives introduced in 1953
Diesel-electric locomotives of Great Britain
Shunting locomotives